Jürgen Haase (born 19 January 1945) is a former track and field athlete and Olympian, who, competing for East Germany, was among the world's best long distance track runners in the 1960s and 1970s. Twice during this period, in 1966 and 1969, he was European champion in the 10,000 meters.

Career
Haase trained with methods developed by Arthur Lydiard, the New Zealand trainer who was, at the time, still relatively unknown in Europe and was the surprise winner of the 1965 GDR 10,000 metres.

At the European Championships in 1966, his teammate Jürgen May convinced him, with the help of a $500 bribe, not to wear his usual Adidas shoes but rather to wear Puma.  This episode became something of a political scandal, in the course of which Haase was pardoned by the GDR Sports authorities.  May, on the other hand, was permanently banned from the GDR national team.

Haase missed the 1972 Summer Olympics due to blood poisoning that he received after being injured by the spike of another runner at a competition in Paris.

After retiring from competitions in 1973, Haase was active in customer service and marketing of medical technology. He then graduated from the Deutsche Hochschule für Körperkultur und Sport (German College for Fitness Training and Sport) and became a coach at SC Dynamo Berlin. His trainees included Kathrin Weßel (bronze medalist in 10,000 m at the 1987 World Championships) and Detlef Wagenknecht (World Cup medalist in 800 m in 1981 and 1983).  After the reunification of Germany, Haase worked at the Deutschen Leichtathletik-Verbandes (German Track Federation).

International races
 1964, European Junior Championships: 1st place: 1500 m (3:52.4); 1st place: 3000 m (8:25.4)
 1966, European Championships: 1st place: 10,000 m (28:26.0); 11th place: 5000 m (13:55.6 )
 1967, European Cup: 1st place: 10,000 m (28:54.2); 2nd place: 5000 m (15:27.8)
 1968, Olympic Games: 15th place: 10,000 m (30:24.0)
 1969, European Championships: 1st place: 10,000 m (28:41.6)
 1970, European Cup: 1st place: 10,000 m (28:26.8)
 1971, European Championships: 2nd place: 10,000 m (27:53.4)

East German championships
 10,000 m: 1st place – 1965, 1966, 1968, 1970, 1972 and 1973 
 5000 m: 1st place – 1969, 2nd place – 1973
 Cross-country running 12 km: 2nd place – 1966, 1st place – 1967, 1968, 1969 and 1972
 3000 m indoor: 2nd place – 1965 and 1966, 3rd place – 1970

Records
10,000 m 
 East German record: 28:12.6, 25 May 1966, Leipzig
 European record: 28:04.4, 21 July 1968, Leningrad
 East German record: 27:53.36, 10 August 1971, Helsinki
 15 km road run
 GDR record: 43:45.2, 21 April 1974, Sachsenhausen (Current German Record as of November 2015)
 20 km road run
 GDR record: 58:56, 1973
 One hour run
 GDR record: 20,393 Meters, 6 May 1973, Dresden

References

1945 births
Living people
East German male long-distance runners
Athletes (track and field) at the 1968 Summer Olympics
Olympic athletes of East Germany
German athletics coaches
European Athletics Championships medalists
SC Leipzig athletes